Pita (Pular: 𞤍𞤢𞤤𞤭𞥅𞤪𞤫 𞤆𞤭𞤼𞤢) is a prefecture located in the Mamou Region of Guinea. The capital is Pita. The prefecture covers an area of 4,320 km.² and has an estimated population of 266,000.

Sub-prefectures
The prefecture is divided administratively into 12 sub-prefectures:
 Pita-Centre
 Bantignel
 Bourouwal-Tappé
 Dongol-Touma
 Gongore
 Ley-Miro
 Maci
 Ninguélandé
 Sangaréah
 Sintali
 Timbi-Madina
 Timbi-Touny 
 Djindjin
 Keriwel

Prefectures of Guinea
Mamou Region